Statistical Analysis Centers (SACs) are state agencies created by legislation or Executive Order that collect, analyze, and disseminate criminal and juvenile justice data. They contribute to effective state policies through statistical services, research, evaluation, and policy analysis. 

SACs are nonpartisan and strive to serve all branches of the criminal justice system and all levels of government in a state as well as the general public. Objectivity, independence, and visibility are important considerations in determining their placement in the state government. SACs are located in a variety of different settings in the states; the majority are a component of the state justice administrative or planning agency.  For those located in an agency with line responsibilities in the criminal justice system (e.g. State Police, Department of Corrections, Office of the Attorney General), special provisions are needed to ensure the SACs’ broad mission, objectivity, independence, and visibility. SACs are staffed by professionals skilled in the application of statistical methods and techniques, who are familiar with the factors, issues, and processes involved in crime and the criminal justice system. Currently, there are SACs in all 50 states, the District of Columbia, Puerto Rico, and the Northern Mariana Islands.  Most of the state SACs receive funding support from the Bureau of Justice Statistics, U.S. Department of Justice as well as other offices within that agency.  Nationally, the SACs are represented through a membership organization, the Justice Research and Statistics Association, a private, nonprofit agency.

External links 

Legal organizations based in the United States
Law enforcement in the United States